Daniel Earl Rapp (May 9, 1941 – April 3, 1983) was an American singer and the frontman for the  group Danny & the Juniors. The group is best known for their 1958 hit "At the Hop".

Career 
Rapp's musical career began in 1955 with the formation of his group The Juvenairs, which later became known as Danny and the Juniors. Their 1957 song "Do the Bop" came to the attention of Dick Clark, who suggested they rename it to "At the Hop".  After limited initial success with the song, it became a worldwide hit when it was played on American Bandstand. The Juniors went on to have two more hits "Rock and Roll Is Here to Stay" and "Twistin' USA". The Juniors released several more records in the 1960s but were not able to produce any more hits. In the 1970s, they capitalized on a strong 1950s nostalgia movement by touring and rerecording "At The Hop" in 1976.

Danny and the Juniors broke up and regrouped over the years, and split into 2 groups in 1978. One featured Joe Terranova and Frank Maffei, while the other featured Rapp with various backing singers. Both groups performed under the "Danny and the Juniors" name.

Rapp's last performance was in Phoenix, Arizona, at the Silver Lining Lounge of The Different Pointe restaurant in the Pointe Tapatio Resort in a month-long engagement which was scheduled to end on Saturday, April 2, 1983.

Death 
He was seen on Saturday drinking heavily in the Jigsaw, one of the two bars in town. Sometime over the weekend, he bought a .25-caliber automatic from a private individual.

Rapp's body was found in his hotel room on Sunday, April 3, with a single self-inflicted gunshot wound to the right side of the head.

Personal life 
Rapp was married in 1962 and had two sons.

References

External links 
 Danny and the Juniors Official Website
 
 
 News story concerning Rapp suicide

1941 births
1983 suicides
American male pop singers
Danny & the Juniors members
Musicians from Philadelphia
Musicians from New Orleans
American people of Irish descent
Suicides by firearm in Arizona
Doo-wop musicians
20th-century American singers
Singers from Pennsylvania
Singers from Louisiana
20th-century American male singers
1983 deaths